Whitelackington is a village and civil parish on the A303 one mile north east of Ilminster, in Somerset, England. The parish includes Dillington Park and the hamlets of Atherstone and Ashwell.

Etymology
The village's name is from Old English and is composed of two elements: the Old English personal name Hwitlāc and tun meaning "farm" but here in the sense of "estate, village". The name was recorded as Witelecintone in 1127.

History 

Whitelackington was part of the hundred of Abdick and Bulstone.

The village was the main home in the 17th century of the Speke family, including George Speke, Mary Speke and their son Hugh Speke.

Rev. F. C. Johnson was vicar from 1825 to 1874. His wife was the elder sister of James Brooke, Rajah of Sarawak, and their second son, Charles, succeeded him after his elder brother, John Brooke Johnson (later changed to Brooke) was disinherited. John is buried in the churchyard, along with some other family members.

Governance

The parish council has responsibility for local issues, including setting an annual precept (local rate) to cover the council's operating costs and producing annual accounts for public scrutiny. The parish council evaluates local planning applications and works with the local police, district council officers, and neighbourhood watch groups on matters of crime, security, and traffic.

The parish council's role also includes initiating projects for the maintenance and repair of parish facilities, as well as consulting with the district council on the maintenance, repair, and improvement of highways, drainage, footpaths, public transport, and street cleaning. Conservation matters (including trees and listed buildings) and environmental issues are also the responsibility of the council.

The village falls within the Non-metropolitan district of South Somerset, which was formed on 1 April 1974 under the Local Government Act 1972, having previously been part of Chard Rural District. The district council is responsible for local planning and building control, local roads, council housing, environmental health, markets and fairs, refuse collection and recycling, cemeteries and crematoria, leisure services, parks, and tourism.

Somerset County Council is responsible for running the largest and most expensive local services such as education, social services, libraries, main roads, public transport, policing and fire services, trading standards, waste disposal and strategic planning.

It is also part of the Yeovil county constituency represented in the House of Commons of the Parliament of the United Kingdom. It elects one Member of Parliament (MP) by the first past the post system of election, and was part of the South West England constituency of the European Parliament prior to Britain leaving the European Union in January 2020, which elected seven MEPs using the d'Hondt method of party-list proportional representation.

Church 
The Church of St Mary the Virgin dates from the 14th century, and was built from hamstone. The interior fittings include a 14th-century piscina in the north transept, and in the east wall there is a richly decorated statue niche. Monuments include two defaced effigies on the floor of the south transept, a civilian of around 1350 and a knight in armour of 1375. The tomb of Sir George Speke (died 1583) is in Perpendicular rather than Renaissance style. There is also a monument to John Hanning (died 1807) by J. Richards of Exeter. The church has been designated by English Heritage as a Grade II* listed building.

Further reading
Collinson, Rev. John,  History and Antiquities of the County of Somerset, Vol.1, Bath, 1791, pp. 66–70, White-Lackington

References

External links

Villages in South Somerset
Civil parishes in Somerset